Tuleariocaris is a genus of shrimp comprising the following species:

Tuleariocaris holthuisi Hipeau-Jacquotte, 1965
Tuleariocaris neglecta Chace, 1969
Tuleariocaris sarec Berggren, 1994
Tuleariocaris zanzibarica Bruce, 1967

References

Palaemonoidea